Proto-Polynesian (abbreviated PPn) is the hypothetical proto-language from which all the modern Polynesian languages descend. It is a daughter language of the Proto-Austronesian language. Historical linguists have reconstructed the language using the comparative method, in much the same manner as with Proto-Indo-European and Proto-Uralic. This same method has also been used to support the archaeological and ethnographic evidence which indicates that the ancestral homeland of the people who spoke Proto-Polynesian was in the vicinity of Tonga, Samoa, and nearby islands.

Phonology

Proto-Polynesian has a small phonological inventory, with 13 consonants and 5 vowels.

Consonants

Vowels
Proto-Polynesian has five vowels, with no length distinction.  In a number of daughter languages, successive sequences of vowels came together to produce long vowels and diphthongs, and in some languages these sounds later became phonemic.

Sound correspondences

Vocabulary
The following is a table of some sample vocabulary as it is represented orthographically in various languages. All instances of  represent a glottal stop, IPA . The letter  in all cases represents voiced alveolar tap , not .

See also
 Proto-Oceanic language
 Proto-Austronesian language
 Proto-Malayo-Polynesian language
 Proto-Philippine language

Notes

External links

Polynesian languages
Polynesian